The  Tampa Bay Storm season was the fifth season for the Arena Football League franchise, and its first season as the Tampa Bay Storm. The team was sold to Bob Gries in 1990, and he quickly moved the team from Pittsburgh, Pennsylvania to St. Petersburg, Florida.  The team played their home games at the Florida Suncoast Dome.

Regular season

Schedule

Standings

y – clinched regular-season title

x – clinched playoff spot

Playoffs

Roster

Awards

References

External links
1991 Tampa Bay Storm season at arenafan.com

Tampa Bay Storm
Tampa Bay Storm seasons
Tampa Bay Storm
ArenaBowl champion seasons